Asbeel (Heb. עזב azab "to abandon" + אל el "God", meaning "God has forsaken" or "deserter of God") is a fallen angel that appears in the first book of Enoch, chapter 69, verse 5:

"And the second was named Asbeel: he imparted to the holy sons of God evil counsel, and led them astray so that they defiled their bodies with the daughters of men."

Asbeel was listed as the second of five "satans" who led astray the Grigori by falling in love with humans. There were also Yeqon (or Yaqum, "he shall rise"), Gadreel ("wall of God"), Penemue ("the inside"), and Kasdaye ("Chaldean", "covered hand").

He is also referred to in the film The Devil Inside, as a woman possessed shouts she is 'Asbeel'.

See also
 List of angels in theology
Kasbeel

References 

Watchers (angels)
Demons in the Old Testament apocrypha
Angels in the Book of Enoch